No. 2 Group is a group of the Royal Air Force which was first activated in 1918, served from 1918–20, from 1936 through the Second World War to 1947, from 1948 to 1958, from 1993 to 1996, was reactivated in 2000, and is today part of Air Command.

The group is sometimes referred to as the Air Combat Support Group, as it controls the aircraft used to support the Royal Navy and RAF's front line combat force. Assets under command includes the Strategic and Tactical Air Transport aircraft (including VIP/Communication), the RAF Police, field squadrons of the RAF Regiment, and Air-to-Air Refuelling aircraft. The group headquarters is located alongside Headquarters Air Command at RAF High Wycombe in Buckinghamshire.

Subordinate stations
As of 1 April 2017, the following stations and squadrons are under the command of 2 Group.
 RAF Brize Norton: 10, 24, 47, 70, 99 and 101 Squadrons
 RAF Northolt: 32 Squadron
 RAF Honington: Force Protection Force HQ. Squadrons and Flights at various stations.

History
No. 2 Group was originally formed as No. 2 (Training) Group on 1 April 1918 at Oxford. The unit was disbanded at RAF Uxbridge on 31 March 1920 as the need for training had lessened following the armistice.

The Group was reformed as No. 2 (Bombing) Group on 20 March 1936, with its headquarters base at Abingdon in Oxfordshire. By the outbreak of war Group Headquarters were at RAF Wyton, Cambridgeshire and composed of the following squadrons and Wings; Nos. 18 and 57 Squadrons (composing 70 Wing at RAF Upper Heyford Oxfordshire) ; Nos. 21 and 82 Squadrons (79 Wing, RAF Watton, Norfolk) Nos. 90 and 101 Squadrons (81 Wing, RAF West Raynham Norfolk), Nos. 114 and 139 Squadrons (82 Wing, Wyton) and Nos. 107 and 110 Squadrons (83 Wing, RAF Wattisham Suffolk)

79, 81, 82 and 83 Wings formed part of the Advanced Air Striking Force, and 70 Wing was earmarked for service with the Field Force in France. The force consisted of Bristol Blenheim Mk. IVs and the Blenheim Mk. I.

On 3 September 1939, the day war broke out, a Blenheim from 2 Group made the first British operational sortie to cross the German frontier in the Second World War. The following day saw the Group's Blenheims make the first British bombing attack of the war.

In April 1940, Norway was invaded by the Germans. In response to a request for air support  two Blenheim squadrons, Nos. 110 and 107, were placed on temporary detachment to RAF Lossiemouth in Moray, from where they could attack shipping and the German held airfield at Stavanger in southern Norway.

The Group carried out intensive operations against the advancing Germans in the Battle of France following their breakthrough of 10 May 1940, suffering heavy losses. On 17 May, twelve crews of No. 82 Squadron left Watton to attack enemy columns near Gembloux. A severe flak barrage split the formation up, allowing Messerschmitt Bf 109s to attack. Only one Blenheim, managed to return to Watton, the rest shot down. No.82 Squadron was again operational just three days later. During June, Blenheims began a new phase by bombing Luftwaffe airfields in France. In July the twelve Blenheim squadrons of 2 Group lost 31 aircraft, along with three Wing Commanders.

During the summer the light bomber force also supported defensive operations during the Battle of Britain, bombing German invasion barges concentrated in the Channel ports.

As Bomber Command commenced on its nighttime bomber offensive against Germany 2 Group was set aside to engage in daylight raids on shipping, coastal ports and other heavily defended targets across the channel in Occupied Europe. At that stage of the war the Group’s Blenheims were near obsolete and sustaining heavy operational casualties. Nevertheless, operations continued unabated under Air Vice-Marshal D F Stevenson, a man who was infamous throughout the RAF at the time for his ruthless aggressiveness, his ambition and his lack of concern for the high loss rates suffered by his crews. Even Churchill was greatly disturbed by the loss rates on the attacks Stevenson was ordering his crews to fly. Upon his removal as Air Officer Commanding (AOC) in December 1941 his crews were greatly relieved.

No. 2 Group carried out a low-level attack on Bremen on 2 July 1941 in which the leader, Wing Commander Hughie Edwards of No. 105 Squadron, won the Victoria Cross.

2 Group supported the ill-fated Dieppe Raid in August 1942. Mosquito Mk IV's also made the first daylight attack on Berlin.

On 6 December 1942 James Pelly-Fry led  2 Group's Operation Oyster daylight raid on the Philips electrical works at Eindhoven in the Netherlands. Eight of 2 Group's squadrons were committed to the raid, which was complicated by the need to use three different types of bomber aircraft to get an adequate bomb load to the target. The raid involved the use of de Havilland Mosquitos, Douglas Bostons and Lockheed Venturas. Losses to 2 Group were heavy, with 14 aircraft brought down by flak and enemy fighters, a 20% loss rate. Three more aircraft crash-landed on returning to England. Fifty-seven aircraft had been damaged and needed repairs. The raid was successful in devastating the Philips works, which did not return to production of radio tubes and other electronic equipment for six months. Casualties suffered by the Dutch workers and civilian population, though substantial, were significantly less than what would have occurred if the mission had been attempted by the heavy bombers in a massive night raid.

At the end of May 1943 the Group left RAF Bomber Command to join the new Second Tactical Air Force, and came under Fighter Command control until the formation of the Allied Expeditionary Air Force five months later.

2 Group Mosquitos also made the famous wall-breaching operation against Amiens gaol in early 1944 which cost Group Captain Charles Pickard (of Target for Tonight film fame) his life. By the Normandy landings on D-day, No. 2 Group consisted of four wings of Douglas Bostons, North American Mitchells, and Mosquito light and medium bombers.

During Operation Market Garden in September 1944 the Group included 136, 138, and 140 Wings, flying Mosquitos. and 137 & 139 Wings, flying the Mitchell.

No. 2 Group flew just over 57,000 operational sorties at a cost of 2,671 men killed or missing and 396 wounded.

It was disbanded on 1 May 1947 and reformed on 1 December 1948 within the British Air Force of Occupation. It was transferred again to Second Tactical Air Force on 1 September 1951. On 1 July 1956, No. 2 Group appeared to encompass wings at RAF Ahlhorn (No. 125 Wing RAF), RAF Fassberg (No. 121 Wing RAF), RAF Gutersloh (No. 551 Wing RAF, under the control of Bomber Command), Jever (No. 122 Wing RAF),  RAF Laarbruch (No. 34 Wing RAF), RAF Oldenburg (No. 124 Wing RAF), and RAF Wunstorf (No. 123 Wing RAF). No. 2 Group was disbanded on 15 November 1958.

It was reformed 1 April 1993 by renaming RAF Germany and was then disbanded on 1 April 1996 with absorption into No. 1 Group RAF.
It was reformed on 7 January 2000 to take control of air transport, air-to-air refuelling and airborne early warning within the RAF. The AOC's two principal subordinates were Air Commodore AT/AAR & C3I (directing air transport, AAR, and C3I) and Air Commodore Royal Air Force Regiment & Survive to Operate. On 1 April 2006 it took over the responsibilities of No. 3 Group RAF, which was disbanded.

Commanders

1918 to 1920
1 April 1918 Lieutenant Colonel W R Freeman

1936 to 1947
1936 Air Commodore B E Sutton
1 September 1936 Air Commodore S J Goble (RAAF)
2 December 1937 Air Commodore C H B Blount
16 May 1938 Air Vice-Marshal C T Maclean
17 April 1940 Air Vice-Marshal J M Robb
12 February 1941 Air Vice-Marshal D F Stevenson
17 December 1941 Air Vice-Marshal A Lees
29 December 1942 Air Vice-Marshal J H D'Albiac
1 June 1943 Air Vice-Marshal B E Embry
8 August 1945 Air Vice-Marshal P E Maitland
18 March 1946 Air Commodore L W Cannon
3 June 1946 Air Vice-Marshal A L Paxton

1948 to 1958
1 December 1948 Air Commodore L F Sinclair
16 January 1950 Air Commodore The Earl of Bandon
18 June 1951 Air Commodore H D McGregor
9 November 1953 Air Vice-Marshal J R Hallings-Pott
1 July 1955 Air Vice-Marshal S R Ubee

1993 to 1996
1 April 1993 Air Vice-Marshal G A Robertson
17 January 1994 Air Vice-Marshal R H Goodall

2000 to present
1 April 2000 Air Vice-Marshal K D Filbey
2 August 2002 Air Vice-Marshal N D A Maddox
January 2005 Air Vice-Marshal I W McNicoll
9 February 2007 Air Vice-Marshal A D Pulford
16 September 2008 Air Vice-Marshal S J Hillier
October 2010 Air Vice-Marshal P C Osborn
18 January 2013 Air Vice-Marshal S K P Reynolds
July 2015 Air Vice-Marshal G D A Parker
June 2017 Air Vice Marshal D J E Cooper
September 2019 Air Vice-Marshal A K Gillespie
October 2021 Air Vice-Marshal S A Marshall

See also
 List of Royal Air Force groups

References
Citations

Bibliography

 Bowyer, Michael J.F. 2 Group RAF: A Complete History, 1936–1945. London: Faber and Faber Ltd., 1974. .
 Delve, Ken. The Source Book of the RAF. Shrewsbury, Shropshire, UK: Airlife Publishing Ltd., 1994. .
 Hastings, Max  Bomber Command Minneapolis, MN: Zenith Press, (2013).
 Hunt, Leslie. From Hind to Hunter: A Short History of N°. 2 (B) Group RAF. Chelmsford, UK: Leslie Hunt, ca.1958.
 Moyes, Philip J.R. Bomber Squadrons of the RAF and their Aircraft. London: Macdonald and Jane's (Publishers) Ltd., 1964 (New revised edition 1976, .)

External links
 No 2 Group at Royal Air Force Website
 Air of Authority – A History of RAF Organisation – Group No's 1 – 9

002
Military units and formations established in 1918
Military units and formations of the Royal Air Force in World War I
Organisations based in Buckinghamshire
1918 establishments in the United Kingdom
002
Bomber aircraft units and formations of the Royal Air Force